Yakov Kuzyakov (born 27 August 1963) is a soil scientist and ecologist, he is one of the most frequently cited soil scientists worldwide.

Research and career 
Kuzyakov graduated in 1986 from the Martin Luther University of Halle-Wittenberg in Halle. He defended his PhD at the Russian State Agrarian University – Moscow Timiryazev Agricultural Academy (Moscow) in 1990 under the supervision of Alexey Fokin. Then he headed the radioisotopic laboratory from 1990 to 1993 over there. Later in 1993 Kuzyakov continued his research career at the Humboldt University of Berlin and Leibniz Institute of Vegetable and Ornamental Crops. In 1997 he completed the habilitation at the University of Hohenheim under the supervision of Prof. Karl Stahr. In 2006 he took up a professorship at the department of Agroecosystem Research at the University of Bayreuth. Since 2011, he heads the department of Soil Science of Temperate Ecosystems and the department of Agricultural Soil Science at the University of Göttingen, though he is currently not listed as staff on neither of these department's websites.

Research interests 
Kuzyakov specialises in soil ecology and soil biogeochemistry, rhizosphere processes, agriculture, land use and land degradation, agroecology, C and N cycles, in application of radioactive and stable isotope labelling approaches in soil science. His research group conducts research in all climatic zones including cold deserts, tropical areas and in various ecosystems (agricultural lands, forests, mountains, pastures, etc.). The collaboration includes the projects with other research groups from Germany, Russia, China, Chili, Italy, Indonesia, USA, UK and Australia.

Scientific achievements 
Kuzyakov is a highly cited researcher in the field of Agricultural Sciences for the 2015–2022, he was also included in the list of the most cited Russian scientists in 2017. The H-index is 94 (Scopus database). Yakov has published more than 705 scientific papers, indexed by Web of Science database which include:

 13 papers in the Nature journal series,
 45 scientific reviews,
 44 highly cited papers (top 1% citations),
 16 hot papers (top 0,1 % citations)
 4 papers listed as the most cited over the last 50 years in Soil Biology and Biochemistry
He developed new concepts of Priming effect, Microbial hotspots and hot moments in soil, Transformation of low-molecular organic compounds in soil, Rhizosphere dynamics and stationarity, Root exudation and its localisation, Visualization of enzyme activity in soil, Competition between microorganisms and roots for nutrients, Pedogenic carbonates, Agropedogenesis, Partitioning and quantification of CO2 sources, Biochar stability etc. These concepts were investigated in the frame of global climate change conditions: global warming, elevated СО2 in the atmosphere, drought, N deposition and soil degradation. He is the first to use position specific isotope labelling, 14СО2 and 13СО2 plant labelling combined with autoradiography and zymography coupling with biomarkers. The concepts, ideas and methodical approaches developed by Yakov Kuzyakov group stimulated many research directions worldwide.

Editorship 
Kuzyakov is an editor in several highly rated scientific journals, such as:

 Soil Biology and Biochemistry
 European Journal of Soil Biology
 Rhizosphere
 Biogeosciences
 Land Degradation and Development
 Pedosphere 
 and others

Awards 
During his research career he has received various awards:

 2018: Changjiang (Yangtze River) Scholar Award
 2017: Tianjin's 1000-Talents Short-Term Experts
 2016: EGU Outstanding Editor Award
 2015: High-end Foreign Experts Program CAS, China
 2011: Sir Allan Sewell Fellowship, Griffith University, Brisbane, Australia
 2010: Visiting professor, IGSNRR Beijing, CAS
 2002: Heisenberg Fellowship, DFG

Kuzyakov is also a visiting professor in various universities.

Websites and social networks 

 Personal webpage
 Homepage of publications
 Scopus
 Google Scholar
 Publon
 Research Gate
 Loop
 ORCID
 Dimensions
 LinkedIn
 Twitter

References

External links 

 Kuzyakov's CV

Living people
1963 births
Russian soil scientists
Soil biology